Not Exactly Gentlemen is a 1931 American pre-Code Western film directed by Benjamin Stoloff and written by Dudley Nichols and William Conselman. It is based on the 1917 novel Over the Border by Herman Whitaker. The film stars Victor McLaglen, Fay Wray, Lew Cody, Robert Warwick, Eddie Gribbon, and David Worth. The film was released on March 8, 1931, by Fox Film Corporation.

This film was shown in some theaters with the title Three Rogues. Whitaker's novel was also adapted in film form as the serial Sunset (1916–17) and as Three Bad Men (1926).

Cast    
Victor McLaglen as Bull Stanley
Fay Wray as Lee Carleton
Lew Cody as Ace Beaudry
Robert Warwick as Layne Hunter
Eddie Gribbon as Bronco Dawson
David Worth as Bruce Randall
Joyce Compton as Ace's Girl
Louise Huntington as Bronco's Girl
Franklyn Farnum as Nelson
Carol Wines as Bull's Girl
Jim Farley as Marshal Dunn

References

External links

 

1931 films
American Western (genre) films
1931 Western (genre) films
Fox Film films
Films directed by Benjamin Stoloff
American black-and-white films
1930s English-language films
1930s American films